Adrian Moten (born April 22, 1988) is a former American football linebacker. He was signed by the Indianapolis Colts as an undrafted free agent in 2011. He played college football at Maryland.

Professional career

Indianapolis Colts
On July 29, 2011, Moten was signed by the Indianapolis Colts as an undrafted free agent. He was waived on November 26, 2011. He played in 10 games in the regular season and all 4 preseason games.

Seattle Seahawks
On November 28, 2011, Moten was claimed off waivers by the Seattle Seahawks. On May 15, 2012, he was released by the Seahawks.  He played in 2 regular season games with the Seahawks.

Philadelphia Eagles
On August 6, 2012, Moten was signed by the Philadelphia Eagles. On August 31, 2012, Moten was released as one of the final cuts. On October 2, 2012, Moten was re-signed and then released on October 9, 2012.  He played in 1 regular season game and all 4 preseason games with the Eagles.

Cleveland Browns
On December 18, 2012, Moten was signed by the Cleveland Browns. He was waived on August 3, 2013.

Detroit Lions
On August 5, 2013, Moten was claimed off waivers by the Detroit Lions. On August 17, 2013, he was released by the Lions.  He played in 3 preseason games.

Saskatchewan Roughriders 
Moten signed with the Saskatchewan Roughriders on May 16, 2014.

Ottawa Redblacks
Moten was signed to the Ottawa Redblacks' practice roster on August 26, 2014. He was released by the Redblacks on September 6, 2014.

References

External links
 Saskatchewan Roughriders bio
 Philadelphia Eagles bio
 Indianapolis Colts bio
 Maryland Terrapins bio

1988 births
Living people
Players of American football from Maryland
American football linebackers
Canadian football linebackers
African-American players of American football
African-American players of Canadian football
Maryland Terrapins football players
Indianapolis Colts players
Seattle Seahawks players
Philadelphia Eagles players
Cleveland Browns players
Detroit Lions players
Saskatchewan Roughriders players
Ottawa Redblacks players
21st-century African-American sportspeople
20th-century African-American people